Campylocentrum is a genus of rare orchids (family Orchidaceae) native to Mexico, the West Indies, Central America and South America. One species (C. pachyrrhizum) extends its range into Florida.

Ecology

Pollination
Campylocentrum is likely pollinated by microlepidoptera and bees, in addition to flies, which may play a smaller role.

Taxonomy

List of species 
Campylocentrum aciculatum (Rchb.f. & Warm.) Cogn., Fl. Bras. 3(6): 516 (1906). 
Campylocentrum acutilobum Cogn., Fl. Bras. 3(6): 510 (1906). 
Campylocentrum amazonicum Cogn., Fl. Bras. 3(6): 521 (1906). 
Campylocentrum apiculatum Schltr., Repert. Spec. Nov. Regni Veg. 27: 84 (1929). 
Campylocentrum ariza-juliae Ames, Bot. Mus. Leafl. 6: 23 (1938). 
Campylocentrum aromaticum Barb.Rodr., Contr. Jard. Bot. Rio de Janeiro 4: 103 (1907). 
Campylocentrum asplundii Dodson, Orquideologia 19: 79 (1993). 
Campylocentrum bonifaziae Dodson, Orquideologia 22: 191 (2003). 
Campylocentrum brachycarpum Cogn., Fl. Bras. 3(6): 512 (1906). 
Campylocentrum brenesii Schltr., Repert. Spec. Nov. Regni Veg. Beih. 19: 268 (1923). 
Campylocentrum callistachyum Cogn., Fl. Bras. 3(6): 514 (1906). 
Campylocentrum colombianum Schltr., Repert. Spec. Nov. Regni Veg. Beih. 7: 205 (1920). 
Campylocentrum cornejoi Dodson, Orquideologia 22: 192 (2003). 
Campylocentrum crassirhizum Hoehne, Arq. Bot. Estado São Paulo, n.s., f.m., 1: 44 (1939). 
Campylocentrum densiflorum Cogn., Fl. Bras. 3(6): 511 (1906). 
Campylocentrum ecuadorense Schltr., Repert. Spec. Nov. Regni Veg. Beih. 8: 171 (1921). 
Campylocentrum embreei Dodson, Orquideologia 19: 81 (1993). 
Campylocentrum fasciola (Lindl.) Cogn., Fl. Bras. 3(6): 520 (1906). 
Campylocentrum gracile Cogn., Fl. Bras. 3(6): 513 (1906). 
Campylocentrum grisebachii Cogn., Fl. Bras. 3(6): 522 (1906). 
Campylocentrum hasslerianum Hoehne, Arq. Bot. Estado São Paulo, n.s., f.m., 1: 23 (1938). 
Campylocentrum helorrhizum (Dod) Nir, Orchid. Antill.: 59 (2000). 
Campylocentrum hirtellum Cogn., Fl. Bras. 3(6): 521 (1906). 
Campylocentrum hirtzii Dodson, Icon. Pl. Trop., II, 5: t. 409 (1989). 
Campylocentrum hondurense Ames, Schedul. Orchid. 5: 37 (1923). 
Campylocentrum huebneri Mansf., Notizbl. Bot. Gart. Berlin-Dahlem 10: 382 (1928). 
Campylocentrum huebnerioides D.E.Benn. & Christenson, Icon. Orchid. Peruv.: t. 408 (1998). 
Campylocentrum iglesiasii Brade, Arq. Serv. Florest. 1(2): 2 (1941). 
Campylocentrum intermedium (Rchb.f. & Warm.) Rolfe, Orchid Rev. 11: 245 (1903). 
Campylocentrum latifolium Cogn., Fl. Bras. 3(6): 509 (1906). 
Campylocentrum linearifolium Schltr. ex Mansf., Repert. Spec. Nov. Regni Veg. 24: 246 (1928). 
Campylocentrum madisonii Dodson, Icon. Pl. Trop., II, 5: t. 410 (1989). 
Campylocentrum micranthum (Lindl.) Rolfe, Orchid Rev. 9: 136 (1901). 
Campylocentrum microphyllum Ames & Correll, Bot. Mus. Leafl. 10: 88 (1942). 
Campylocentrum minus Fawc. & Rendle, J. Bot. 47: 127 (1909). 
Campylocentrum minutum C.Schweinf., Amer. Orchid Soc. Bull. 17: 108 (1948). 
Campylocentrum natalieae Carnevali & I.Ramírez, BioLlania, Ed. Espec. 6: 282 (1997). 
Campylocentrum neglectum (Rchb.f. & Warm.) Cogn., Bull. Herb. Boissier, II, 1: 425 (1901). 
Campylocentrum organense (Rchb.f.) Rolfe, Orchid Rev. 11: 245 (1903). 
Campylocentrum ornithorrhynchum (Lindl.) Rolfe, Orchid Rev. 11: 246 (1903). 
Campylocentrum pachyrrhizum (Rchb.f.) Rolfe, Orchid Rev. 11: 246 (1903). 
Campylocentrum panamense Ames, Orchidaceae 7: 88 (1922). 
Campylocentrum parahybunense (Barb.Rodr.) Rolfe, Orchid Rev. 11: 246 (1903). 
Campylocentrum pauloense Hoehne & Schltr., Arch. Bot. São Paulo 1: 297 (1926). 
Campylocentrum pernambucense Hoehne, Arq. Bot. Estado São Paulo, n.s., f.m., 1: 22 (1938). 
Campylocentrum poeppigii (Rchb.f.) Rolfe, Orchid Rev. 11: 246 (1903). 
Campylocentrum polystachyum Rolfe, Orchid Rev. 11: 245 (1903). 
Campylocentrum pubirhachis Schltr., Anexos Mem. Inst. Butantan, Secç. Bot. 1(55): 67 (1922). 
Campylocentrum pugioniforme (Klotzsch) Rolfe, Orchid Rev. 11: 245 (1903). 
Campylocentrum puyense Dodson, Orquideologia 22: 195 (2003). 
Campylocentrum pygmaeum Cogn. in I.Urban, Symb. Antill. 4: 183 (1903). 
Campylocentrum rimbachii Schltr., Repert. Spec. Nov. Regni Veg. Beih. 8: 172 (1921). 
Campylocentrum robustum Cogn., Fl. Bras. 3(6): 509 (1906). 
Campylocentrum schiedei (Rchb.f.) Benth. ex Hemsl., Biol. Cent.-Amer., Bot. 3: 292 (1884). 
Campylocentrum schneeanum Foldats, Bol. Soc. Venez. Ci. Nat. 22: 274 (1961). 
Campylocentrum sellowii (Rchb.f.) Rolfe, Orchid Rev. 11: 246 (1903). 
Campylocentrum spannagelii Hoehne, Arq. Bot. Estado São Paulo, n.s., f.m., 1: 22 (1938). 
Campylocentrum steyermarkii Foldats, Acta Bot. Venez. 3: 316 (1968). 
Campylocentrum tenellum Todzia, Ann. Missouri Bot. Gard. 72: 877 (1985). 
Campylocentrum tenue (Lindl.) Rolfe, Orchid Rev. 11: 246 (1903). 
Campylocentrum tyrridion Garay & Dunst., Venez. Orchids Ill. 2: 54 (1961). 
Campylocentrum ulaei Cogn., Fl. Bras. 3(6): 514 (1906). 
Campylocentrum wawrae (Rchb.f. ex Beck) Rolfe, Orchid Rev. 11: 246 (1903). 
Campylocentrum zehntneri Schltr., Repert. Spec. Nov. Regni Veg. 21: 342 (1925).

Horticulture
Campylocentrum is uncommon in cultivation. It can be grown mounted on bark under moist conditions. The species with functional leaves should be grown with additional moss, while the leafless species should be grown without it.

References

External links 
 
 

 
Orchids of Central America
Orchids of North America
Orchids of South America
Vandeae genera